Mahara is a free and open-source web-based electronic portfolio (eportfolio) management system written in PHP and distributed under the GNU Public License. The Māori language word  means "to think about or consider".

History 

Mahara began in 2006 as a collaboration between Massey University, Auckland University of Technology, the Open Polytechnic of New Zealand and Victoria University of Wellington, funded by the New Zealand Tertiary Education Commission. Mahara was initially developed by Catalyst IT Limited, a New Zealand open-source software company, and first released in April 2008. Development of Mahara has since expanded to include a community of contributors, including the New Zealand Ministry of Education.

The software was designed to be an open-source electronic portfolio platform to support the student learning and personal learning environment goals of educational institutions. Mahara allows students to select their own work and prepare an online portfolio, to both share in a university classroom context and show to future employers.

Language support 

Mahara supports translation into different languages using language packs, and contributions of complete or near-complete coverage have been provided for Japanese, Basque, French, Māori, Slovenian, German, Czech, and Danish languages.

References

External links 
 

Cross-platform software
Free educational software
Free learning support software
Free software programmed in PHP
Free content management systems
Classroom management software